This Is Christmas, stylised This is Christmas, is a 2022 British romantic comedy film directed by Chris Foggin from a screenplay written by Alastair Galbraith. The film stars an ensemble cast including Kaya Scodelario, Alfred Enoch, Nadia Parkes, Timothy Spall, Ben Miller, Sarah Niles, Jeremy Irvine, Alexandra Roach, and Joanna Scanlan.

Premise
Emma and Adam both commute in silence to London each day. One day, Adam invites the whole carriage of regular commuters to hold their own Christmas party.

Cast
 Kaya Scodelario as Emma
 Alfred Enoch as Adam
 Nadia Parkes as Suzy
 Timothy Spall as Ray
 Ben Miller as Jonathan
 Jack Donoghue as Dean
 Jeremy Irvine as Simon
 Alexandra Roach as Amanda
 Joanna Scanlan as Linda
 Sarah Niles as Judith
 Clinton Liberty as Michael
 Robert Emms as Paul
 Steve Oram as conductor
 Laura Aikman as Polly
 Rebecca Root as Miranda
 Virginia Thompson as Fay

Production
Filming took place in 2022 in London and Hertfordshire. Despite the Christmas theme and costumes the first week of filming took place in a heatwave with temperatures over 40 degree Celsius.

Release
This is Christmas was released on Sky Cinema in the United Kingdom on 9 December 2022. In the United States, the film will air on Epix.

Reception
Gabriella Geisinger in Digital Spy described it as “2022's best festive film” with “just enough sugary sweetness, coupled with a hint of sombreness, and – of course – a happy ending to make it a perfect Christmas movie.”

See also
 List of Christmas films

Notes

References

External links
 

2022 films
2020s English-language films
British romantic comedy films
British Christmas comedy films
Films set in London
2020s British films